Colin Fraser-Grant (2 July 1899 – 4 May 1976) was a South African cricketer. He played in six first-class matches for Border in 1929/30.

See also
 List of Border representative cricketers

References

External links
 

1899 births
1976 deaths
South African cricketers
Border cricketers
People from Graaff-Reinet
Cricketers from the Eastern Cape